Hendon North was a constituency in the former Municipal Borough of Hendon (later subsumed into the London Borough of Barnet) which returned one Member of Parliament (MP)  to the House of Commons of the Parliament of the United Kingdom. It was created for the 1945 general election as the existing Hendon constituency was too large (the estimated electorate in 1941 was 217,900 ), and lasted until the 1997 general election when the London Borough of Barnet's Parliamentary representation was reduced from four seats to three.

Boundaries
1945–1974: The Municipal Borough of Hendon wards of Burnt Oak, Edgware, Mill Hill, and West Hendon.

1974–1997: The London Borough of Barnet wards of Burnt Oak, Colindale, Edgware, Hale, and Mill Hill.

Members of Parliament

Elections

Elections in the 1990s

Elections in the 1980s

Elections in the 1970s

Elections in the 1960s

Elections in the 1950s

Elections in the 1940s

Notes and references 

Constituencies of the Parliament of the United Kingdom established in 1945
Constituencies of the Parliament of the United Kingdom disestablished in 1997
Hendon